Zoltán Ernő Kőváry (born 29 April 1974) is a Hungarian indie musician, best known as the lead singer, songwriter, lyricist, guitarist and of the garage rockband The Trousers. 
He is an associate professor at the
Faculty of Pedagogy and Psychology of the Eötvös Loránd University.

Early life and personal life
Kőváry was born in Békéscsaba, Hungary. He attended the Rózsa Ferenc secondary school. He graduated from the University of Szeged in Hungarian literature and Hungarian language. Later, he obtained a Bachelor of Arts degree from the University of Debrecen in psychology. He specialised in clinical psychology at the Semmelweis University in Budapest.

Academic career
He is an associate professor at the 
Institute of Psychology of the
Department of Clinical Psychology and Addiction at Eötvös Loránd University.

Major publications
Top five publications based on Google Scholar.
Psychobiography as a method. The revival of studying lives: New perspectives in personality and creativity research. Europe’s Journal of Psychology 7 (4), 739-777, 2011
New trends in psychobiography. Springer, 2019
Life history, clinical practice and the training of psychologists: The potential contribution of psychobiography to psychology as a “rigorous science.” International Journal of Psychology and Psychoanalysis 4 (1), 1-10, 2018
Kreativitás és személyiség: a mélylélektani alkotáselméletektől a pszichobiográfiai kutatásig. Oriold, 2012
Psychobiography, self-knowledge and “Psychology as a Rigorous Science”: Explorations in epistemology, clinical practice and university education. New trends in psychobiography, 99-113, 2019

Amber Smith

Kőváry joined the Indie rock band Amber Smith. Kőváry played on two albums of Amber Smith RePRINT and Introspective.

The Trousers

Kőváry is the founding member of the Hungarian indie-garage rock band called, The Trousers.

Discography
With Amber Smith:
 rePRINT (2006)
 Introspective (2008)

With The Trousers:
Dive insane (2007)
Planetary process (2008)
Soul machine (2010)
Sister Sludge (2012)
Freakbeat (2013)
Mother Of Illusion (2015)

Instruments

Guitars
 Gibson Flying V

Effect pedals
Boss DS-2
Electro-Harmonix Big Muff

Amplifiers
Orange

See also
Budapest indie music scene
Amber Smith
The Trousers

References

External links
 Kőváry on Discogs

1974 births
Living people
Hungarian indie rock musicians